Vasilii Fedorovich Lovtsov, sometimes Grigorii Lovtsov, was a late-eighteenth century Russian navigator and cartographer.

Biography
Still a junior navigator at the time of the expedition of Pyotr Krenitsyn and Mikhail Levashov, in 1767 he was sent from Bolsheretsk on the Kamchatka Peninsula to Tobolsk with papers from Krenitsyn to the governor; detained en route at Okhotsk, the documents he was carrying were opened. In 1782, back at Bolsheretsk, he compiled an atlas of the north Pacific "from Discoveries Made by Russian Mariners and Captain James Cook and His Officers". Later, during Adam Laksman's voyage to Japan in 1792–3, Lovtsov captained the Ekaterina on which they sailed.

See also
Sakoku
Empire of Japan–Russian Empire relations
List of Westerners who visited Japan before 1868

References

18th-century people from the Russian Empire
Explorers from the Russian Empire
Explorers of Asia
Emigrants from the Russian Empire to Japan
Russian cartographers